Abahani Limited cricket team has played List A cricket in the Dhaka Premier League since 2013–14. It has won the title in 2015–16, 2017–18 and 2018–19. In Twenty20 cricket, it also won the 2021 Dhaka Premier Division Twenty20 Cricket League.

History
Between 1974–75, when the Dhaka Premier League was formed, and 2012–13, Abahani Limited won the competition 17 times. Their victories included the inaugural season of 1974–75 and three instances of three championships in a row. Since the competition gained List A status, Abahani have continued to be the most successful team, winning three of the six tournaments.

List A results
 2013-14: 4 wins from 10 matches, finished ninth
 2014-15: 10 wins from 16 matches, finished fourth
 2015-16: 11 wins from 16 matches, champions
 2016-17: 12 wins from 16 matches, finished third
 2017-18: 12 wins from 16 matches, champions
 2018-19: 13 wins from 16 matches, champions
 2019-20: Postponed
 2021-22: 9 wins from 15 matches, finished fourth

Twenty20 results
 2018-19: 1 win from 2 matches, second in Group A
 2019-20: Not held
 2021: 12 wins from 16 matches, champions

Records
Since the Dhaka Premier League gained List A status, Abahani Limited's highest score is 142 by Tamim Iqbal, and the best bowling figures are 7 for 58 by Saqlain Sajib. Both took place in the last match of the 2015–16 season, in which Abahani clinched their first List A title.

Current squad
Players with international caps are listed in bold

References

Dhaka Premier Division Cricket League teams